The canton of Chalamont  is a former administrative division in eastern France. It was disbanded following the French canton reorganisation which came into effect in March 2015. It consisted of 8 communes, which joined the canton of Ceyzériat in 2015. It had 7,033 inhabitants (2012).

The canton comprised 8 communes:

Chalamont
Châtenay
Châtillon-la-Palud
Crans
Le Plantay
Saint-Nizier-le-Désert
Versailleux
Villette-sur-Ain

Demographics

See also
Cantons of the Ain department 
Communes of France

References

Former cantons of Ain
2015 disestablishments in France
States and territories disestablished in 2015